Zhang Zhi may refer to:

 Zhang Zhi (calligrapher) (died 192), Chinese calligrapher
 Zhang Zhi (footballer) (born 1989), Chinese footballer

See also
 Zhang Ji (poet from Hubei) (fl. 8th century), Tang dynasty poet from Hubei
 Zhang Ji (poet from Jiangnan) (c. 766–c. 830), Tang dynasty poet from Jiangnan